Asterivora tristis is a species of moth in the family Choreutidae. It is endemic to New Zealand and has been observed in Tongariro National Park. Adults of this species are on the wing in January.

Taxonomy 
This species was first described by Alfred Philpott in 1930, using specimens collected on the slopes of Mount Ruapehu at Tongariro National Park in January, and named Simaethis inspoliata. In 1939 George Hudson discussed and illustrated this species under that name. In 1979 J. S. Dugdale placed this species within the genus Asterivora. In 1988 Dugdale confirmed this placement. The male holotype specimen is held at the Auckland War Memorial Museum.

Description 

Philpott described this species as follows:
This species is similar to A. albifasciata but lacks the distinguishing whitish sub-terminal shade of the later species.

Distribution
This species is endemic to New Zealand and has been observed in Tongariro National Park.

Behaviour 
The adults of this species are on the wing in January.

References

Asterivora
Moths of New Zealand
Moths described in 1930
Endemic fauna of New Zealand
Taxa named by Alfred Philpott
Endemic moths of New Zealand